Francis Reid "Frank" Murphy  (27 March 1844 - 24 January 1892) was a Member of the Queensland Legislative Assembly. He represented the seat of Barcoo from 1885 to 1892.

Murphy was the eldest son of Sir Francis Murphy (1809–1891). His eldest son was Major Francis Power Murphy.

Murphy died in office in 1892 and was buried in Rockhampton General Cemetery.

References

Members of the Queensland Legislative Assembly
1844 births
1892 deaths
19th-century Australian politicians